Krzysztof Głowacki (born 31 July 1986) is a Polish professional boxer who has held the WBO cruiserweight title twice; from 2015 to 2016 and again in 2019 (elevated from interim champion). As an amateur, he won a bronze medal in the super-heavyweight division at the 2008 EU Championships. As of June 2020, he is ranked as the world's fourth best active cruiserweight by The Ring magazine and third by the Transnational Boxing Rankings Board and BoxRec.

Early life 
Glowacki first started training aikido and karate in the club Orzel Walcz, before finally deciding to pursue a career in boxing. He started boxing at the age of 13, in 1999. He idolizes Mike Tyson. Glowacki became a father at the age of 18, and, after finishing high school realized that he needs to support his family, so he gave up on studying and took up boxing full-time.

Amateur career
Born in Walcz, north west Poland, Krzysztof Głowacki fought 125 amateur fights (103 Wins, 19 Losses and 3 Draws). He became Polish Junior Champion in 2003, 2004 and 2005. In 2007, he finished as runner-up in the Polish Senior Championships in the Super heavyweight category. The following year, he finished as a bronze medalist.

Professional career

Early career 

He made his debut in 2008, defeating Mariusz Radziszewski by points decision. In 2009, Głowacki won vacant Baltic Boxing Union International title, defeating Łukasz Rusiewicz by points decision.

On 18 August 2012, he won the vacant WBO Inter-Continental cruiserweight title, defeating Felipe Romero by sixth-round technical knockout (TKO).

On 31 January 2015, Głowacki won WBO European cruiserweight title by unanimous decision (118-110, 118-110 and 120-108) against Nuri Seferi (36-6, 20 KOs) at Torun, Poland. The bout was as also a WBO cruiserweight title eliminator.

WBO Cruiserweight Champion

Głowacki vs. Huck

On 14 August 2015, Głowacki won the WBO cruiserweight title, defeating Marco Huck (38-2-1, 26 KOs) by eleventh-round knockout. Huck dropped Głowacki with a huge left hand in the sixth round, Głowacki staggered to his feet and threw back everything he had, rocking Huck in the process. Coming into the eleventh round Huck was ahead on the scorecards, Głowacki knocked down Huck with a left-right combination.  As the referee allowed the bout to continue, Głowacki landing two huge right hands and dropped Huck down against the ropes, the referee come in and waved off the bout. Glowacki twice dropped Marco Huck in a knockout that foiled Huck's attempt at a record 14th defense in the 200-pound division at the Prudential Center in Newark, New Jersey. Like Huck, it was Glowacki's first fight outside of Europe. Many consider this as the 2015 fight of the year.

Głowacki vs. Cunningham

On 16 April 2016, he defended the WBO cruiserweight title by unanimous decision (116-108, 115–109, 115-109) against Steve Cunningham. Cunningham was down twice in the second-round and once in tenth and twelfth.

Głowacki vs. Usyk

Głowacki lost the WBO cruiserweight championship against undefeated Ukrainian boxer Oleksandr Usyk (9-0, 9 KOs) on 17 September 2016 at the Ergo Arena in Gdańsk, Poland. The fight was shown live on Sky Sports in the UK. On the night, Usyk outpointed Głowacki after an exciting twelve-round fight with the judges scoring it 119–109, 117–111, and 117–111 all in Usyk's favour.

2018-2019 : World Boxing Super Series

Krzysztof Głowacki entered the second edition of the World Boxing Super Series, with the winner from each weight division taking the Muhammad Ali Trophy, named after the former heavyweight champion Muhammad Ali, and a share of a grand prize.

Głowacki vs. Vlasov
On 10 November 2018 Głowacki won the vacant WBO interim title by unanimous decision (118-110, 117–110, 115-112) against Maxim Vlasov (42-2, 25 KOs) in the World Boxing Super Series cruiserweight quarter-final. Głowacki knocked Vlasov down in the third-round of the bout. The fight took place at the UIC Pavilion in Chicago, United States.

Glowacki vs. Briedis
On 6 February 2019 it was announced that Glowacki would challenge Latvia's Mairis Briedis (25-1, 18KOs) to defend the WBO interim title and their quest for the Ali Trophy in the cruiserweight division semi-final on 15 June at the Arena Riga in Riga, Latvia. On 4 June the WBC made Oleksandr Usyk 'champion in recess', which frees up the vacant WBC cruiserweight title to be on the line for the Briedis vs. Glowacki fight. On 5 June, after Usyk moved up to heavyweight, the WBO made Krzysztof Glowacki their new cruiserweight champion.

On 15 June 2019 in Riga he lost in third-round by TKO to Briedis. The fight raised a lot of controversy at the end of the second-round when, during a clinch, Glowacki punched Briedis in the back of the head. Briedis responded with an elbow to Glowacki's jaw. Glowacki fell down but was able to stand up and referee Robert Byrd continued the fight. Next the referee didn't hear the bell and Glowacki was punched by Briedis which was scored as a knockdown for Briedis. During the bout after the bell, which was not heard by a referee, some of the Briedis' crew entered the ring.

2021

Głowacki vs. Okolie
At the WBO federation convention in Tokyo, it was decided that Głowacki would face Lawrence Okolie for the vacant cruiserweight title. Okolie won by stoppage to hand Głowacki his third defeat.

2022

Głowacki vs. Francisco Rivas Ruiz
Głowacki won in a bout against Francisco Rivas Ruiz, via TKO.

2023

Głowacki vs. Richard Riakporhe
Głowacki lost in a bout against British boxer Richard Riakporhe, via TKO. This bout was on the undercard of Chris Eubank Jr. vs Liam Smith, held in the Manchester Arena in Manchester, England, on the 21 January 2023.

Professional boxing record

References

External links

Krzysztof Glowacki - Profile, News Archive & Current Rankings at Box.Live

1986 births
Living people
People from Wałcz
Sportspeople from West Pomeranian Voivodeship
Polish male boxers
World Boxing Organization champions
World cruiserweight boxing champions
Super-heavyweight boxers